John McNulty may refer to:

 John McNulty (journalist) (1895–1956), American journalist and author
 John McNulty (American football) (born 1968), American football coach
 John McNulty (steamboat captain) (1830–?), Columbia River steamboat captain
 John McNulty (artist) (born 1949), Irish artist
 John McNulty (U.S. Marine Corps) (fl. c. 1918), U.S. Marine Corps’ World War I war hero
 John McNulty (bishop) (1879–1943), English prelate of the Roman Catholic Church
 John F. McNulty Jr. (1917–2004), college track coach
 John J. McNulty Jr. (1922–2009), New York political power broker
 John J. McNulty, III, Col., Chief of U.S. Army House Liaison Division at the Pentagon during Gulf War
 John K. McNulty (born 1934), American legal scholar
 John L. McNulty (1898–?), president of Seton Hall University
 John R. McNulty (1832–1912), Confederacy (American Civil War) war hero
 John F. McNulty (1896–1984), member of the Maryland House of Delegates
 John J. McNulty (1883–1947), member of the Minnesota Legislature
 John McNulty, see Jonathan Letterman, Medical Director of the Army of the Potomac XII Corps 
 John McNulty (Seanad candidate), whose nomination caused a political controversy in Ireland in 2014